The 1982 Notre Dame Fighting Irish football team represented the University of Notre Dame during the 1982 NCAA Division I-A football season.

Schedule

Personnel

Game summaries

Michigan

Source: 
    
    
    
    
    
    
    
    

The first night game played at Notre Dame Stadium.

Purdue

Michigan State

    
    
    
    
    

Notre Dame's first victory in a game without scoring a touchdown since 1970 versus LSU.

Miami (FL)

Arizona

Oregon

Navy

at Pittsburgh

Penn State

at Air Force

at USC

Statistics
Passing: Blair Kiel 118/219, 1273 Yds, 3 TD
Rushing: Phil Carter 179 Rush, 715 Yds, 2 TD
Receiving: Tony Hunter 42 Rec, 507 Yds
Scoring: Mike Johnston 76 Pts

Awards
S Dave Duerson - 1st Team All-American (College & Pro Football Newsweekly, Football News, Football Writers Association of America)
TE Tony Hunter - 1st Team All-American (Newspaper Enterprise Association)
K Mike Johnston - 3rd Team All-American (Football News)
LB Mark Zavagnin - 2nd Team All-American (Football News), 3rd Team All-American (Associated Press)

Team players drafted into the NFL

References

Notre Dame
Notre Dame Fighting Irish football seasons
Notre Dame Fighting Irish football